Człuchów  (Człochòwo, or Człëchòwò; formerly ) is a town in the region of Gdańsk Pomerania, northwestern Poland, with 13,350 inhabitants as of December 2021.

Człuchów has been the capital of Człuchów County in the Pomeranian Voivodeship since 1999. From 1975 to 1998 it was in Słupsk Voivodeship.

Location 

Człuchów lies in a forested area in the southwest of the Pomeranian Voivodeship, at the intersection of Highway 25 from Koszalin to Bydgoszcz and Highway 22 from Gorzów Wielkopolski to Elbląg. The nearest city is Chojnice,  to the east.

History
By the beginning of the 13th century Człuchów was a Slavic settlement under the overlordship of the Kingdom of Poland located at the intersection of two trade routes. In 1312 the Teutonic Knights purchased the settlement for 250 silver marks from Nicholas of Poniec, a son of the voivod of Kalisz. The Order began constructing a fortress known as Schlochau on a hill east of the settlement; the fortress, the Order's second-largest after Marienburg, was completed in 1367. By 1323 it was used as a komturei (bailiwick) by the crusaders and consisted of three support buildings and the main castle. The fortress was so well-developed that Grand Master Heinrich von Dusemer granted the town Kulm law in 1348. After the defeat of the Order in the Thirteen Years' War, the town was transferred to Poland in the Second Peace of Thorn (1466). Many Jews immigrated to the town afterward, creating an enclosed Jewish quarter in the north of the town.

Encouraged by the Polish starosta Latal and the town's German-speaking populace, Schlochau converted to Lutheranism in 1550 during the Protestant Reformation. During the Counter-Reformation and encouraged by the Polish government, the town's main church was reclaimed by Catholics in 1609. By the end of the 16th century Schlochau had 45 houses.  From 1655-57 during the Northern Wars (The Deluge), the previously impregnable castle was captured by the Kingdom of Sweden and the town was heavily damaged.

In 1770 Schlochau (Człuchów) had 135 houses. The town was annexed by the Kingdom of Prussia in the First Partition of Poland in 1772 and was referred to as "Schlochau", while fires in 1786 and 1793 destroyed numerous houses. King Frederick William II of Prussia allowed the usage of bricks from the castle during the rebuilding of the town, leaving the castle only with its keep. After the administrative reorganization of Prussia in 1818, Schlochau became the seat of Landkreis Schlochau in the Regierungsbezirk Marienwerder in the Province of West Prussia. Between 1826-28 the town's Protestant community built its chapel, which included the castle's keep as a church tower. The town began to grow economically after the completion through Schlochau of Reichsstraße 1, a roadway from Berlin to Königsberg. The town also received a boost to its development after the opening of a railway from Neustettin (Szczecinek) to Konitz (Chojnice) in 1878. Schlochau's main street was illuminated by 1844 and businesses began to be established near the eastly-located train station. The town's hospital was established by 1865 and the district's  (savings bank) opened in 1871, the year Schlochau became part of the German Empire.

This negatively impacted the town's trade and economy as it was cut off from much of its hinterland (East and West Prussia), although Schlochau's population grew through immigrants from West Prussian lands lost to Poland. In the 1920s new outlying settlements began to develop from the influx of immigrants, and the town developed a sports center and a district museum. By 1937 Schlochau had a mill, a sawmill, and a population of 6,029 by 1939.

After 1922 the town belonged to the Province of Posen-West Prussia, but with that province's dissolution in 1938 Schlochau became part of Pomerania. In that year the Nazis built a center for 600 members of the Hitler Youth. As the Eastern Front grew closer near the end of World War II, the town's authorities began evacuating Schlochau. The Soviet Red Army reached the district's borders by the end of January 1945, but German resistance prevented them from capturing Schlochau until 17 February 1945, with the town 60% destroyed in the process. Its remaining German-speaking population was expelled to Germany after the war as the town became part of Poland with Polish name as "Człuchów".

Gmina and population

Notable people 
 Ulrich von Jungingen (c.1360–1410) the 26th Grand Master of the Teutonic Knights, 1407-1410
 Major Friedrich Kasiski (1805–1881) a German infantry officer, cryptographer and archeologist
 Martin Grase (1891–1963) a German general during World War II
 Joachim Wandel (1914–1942) a Luftwaffe ace
 Karl Nitz (born 1932) a German judoka 
 Archbishop Eugeniusz Popowicz (born 1961) a Polish Ukrainian Greek Catholic hierarch 
 Ted Pietka (born 1967) a Polish businessman
 Ariel Jakubowski (born 1977) a Polish footballer, over 300 pro games
 Marcin Kobierski (born 1977) a Polish sprint canoer, competed in the 1996 Summer Olympics
 Marta Żmuda Trzebiatowska (born 1984) a Polish film, television and theater actress. 
 Paweł Kaczmarek (born 1995) a Polish sprint kayaker, competed at the 2016 Summer Olympics
 Kamila Baar (born 1979) a Polish film, television and theater actress

International relations

Człuchów is twinned with:

See also
Człuchów (PKP station)

References

External links

City website 
City website 
Gmina of Człuchów
Newspaper reports of Schlochau 

Cities and towns in Pomeranian Voivodeship
Człuchów County